The Last Viking is the eighth studio album by German symphonic metal band Leaves' Eyes. It was released on October 23, 2020, by AFM Records. It is the last album to feature longtime member Thorsten Bauer.

Track listing

Notes
 The digipak, limited and artbook editions feature a second disc, containing the instrumental versions of the first disc.
 The limited and artbook editions of the album features a DVD of a documentary titled "Viking Spirit". A third disc is featured as the soundtrack for the documentary.

Personnel
Leaves' Eyes
 Joris Nijenhuis – drums, viking choir vocals, assistant engineer
 Thorsten Bauer – guitar, bass, mandolin, music, orchestral arrangements, viking choir vocals, assistant engineer
 Micki Richter – guitar, viking choir vocals, assistant engineer
 Alexander Krull – growled vocals, viking choir vocals, music, lyrics, cover concept, recording, engineer, mixing, mastering, programming
 Elina Siirala – female vocals, choir vocals, viking choir vocals

Additional musicians
 Christel Fichtner – choir vocals
 Full Moon Choir – choir vocals
 Uwe Fichtner – viking choir vocals
 Thomas Roth – nyckelharpa
 Lea-Sophie Fischer – solo violin, fiddle
 Susanne Dahle Johansen – spoken words (1)
 Clementine Delauney – guest vocals (5)

Production
 Stefan Heilemann – artwork, cover concept, band photography
 Alex Schuller – assistant engineer
 Jonah Weingarten – songwriting (1)

Charts

References

External links 
Official website

2020 albums
Leaves' Eyes albums
AFM Records albums
Albums produced by Alexander Krull